Myron Tobias Baker (born January 6, 1971) is a former American football linebacker in the  National Football League (NFL). He played for the Chicago Bears (1993–1995) and the Carolina Panthers (1996–1997). He played college football at Louisiana Tech University.

References

1971 births
Living people
American football linebackers
Carolina Panthers players
Chicago Bears players
Louisiana Tech Bulldogs football players
People from Haughton, Louisiana
Players of American football from Louisiana
Brian Piccolo Award winners